The Crown of Our Lady of the Assumption of Popayán, known as the Crown of the Andes (in Spanish as  and as ), is a votive crown originally made for a larger-than-life sized statue of the Virgin Mary in the cathedral of Popayán, Colombia. The oldest parts of the crown are the orb and cross at the top, which date to the 16th century. The diadem was made around 1660, and the arches were added around 1770. The crown is adorned with 450 emeralds, the largest of which is the "Atahualpa Emerald"; this might have belonged to Incan Emperor Atahualpa (1497–1533) and been seized from him when he was captured in 1532 by Francisco Pizarro, a Spanish conquistador. In 1936, the crown was sold by its owners to an American businessman and it has remained in the United States ever since. As of December 2015, the crown belongs to the collection of the Metropolitan Museum of Art in New York City.

Description 
It is made from 18–22 carat gold,  and chased.

History 
Various tales circulate about the construction and origin of the Crown of the Andes. According to the conventional account, it was made in the 1590s in gratitude for the city of Popayán after being spared an outbreak of smallpox which was devastating the region. It includes emeralds purportedly taken from Incan Emperor Atahualpa.  However, Christopher Hartop is a jewellery expert who examined the crown during a proposed sale at Christie's in New York in 1995, and he suggested that it was a composite piece. He dated the little cross at the top to the 16th century, with the bottom half being completed in the 17th century and the intersecting arches dating to the 18th century.

The Crown had a long history of use in the Holy Week celebrations in Popayán, until the Confraternity of the Immaculate Conception (La Cofradía de la Inmaculada Concepción) sought papal permission to sell it in the early decades of the 20th century, dedicating the funds to charitable purposes. Permission was given in 1914, but the sellers did not find a buyer until 1936 when an American syndicate purchased it, led by Chicago businessman Warren J. Piper. Piper said that the crown would be broken up and the jewels sold individually, but this did not happen. Instead, it was exhibited sporadically over the next few decades, notably at Detroit in 1937 when General Motors used it at the unveiling of their new Chevrolet models. 225,000 people are said to have viewed it on that occasion, some 15% of the city's population.  It was also displayed at the 1939 New York World's Fair and in 1959 at the Royal Ontario Museum.

The Crown was not sold during the 1995 sale. Afterwards, it was usually kept in New York, put on display in Indianapolis at an exhibition called Sacred Spain: Art and Belief in the Spanish World held from October 2009 to January 2010 at the Indianapolis Museum of Art. Its acquisition was announced by the Metropolitan Museum in New York in December 2015. It was acquired and exported legally, but it was made in Popayán from local gold and emeralds and used there continually in religious worship for three centuries, and the Instituto Distrital de Cultura y Turismo of Colombia has suggested that it should be returned to the region where it has the most cultural significance.

See also 

 Colombian emeralds
 Muzo

References

External links 

 Internet Stones
 "Sacred Spain: Art and Belief in the Spanish World" - Indianapolis Museum of Art, USA Today
 Photographic image of the display by Darron Cummings, AP, USA Today
 One Sacred Crown, novel about the intrigues of the Crown of the Andes

Andes
Jewellery of the Metropolitan Museum of Art
Metalwork of the Metropolitan Museum of Art
Colombian emeralds